Burdell Young (June 3, 1897 - October 24, 1935), sometimes spelled "Berdell", and nicknamed "Pep", was an American Negro league outfielder in the 1920s.

A native of Sylvania, Georgia, Young made his Negro leagues debut in 1922 with the Bacharach Giants, and played with the club again in 1925. From 1925 to 1928, he played for the Lincoln Giants.

References

External links
 and Baseball-Reference Black Baseball stats and Seamheads

1897 births
1935 deaths
Place of death missing
Bacharach Giants players
Lincoln Giants players
20th-century African-American sportspeople
Baseball outfielders